Willie, Billy, Bill, Will or William Henry may refer to:

Politicians
William Henry (gunsmith) (1729–1786), American gunsmith and Pennsylvania delegate to Continental Congress
William Henry (brother of Patrick Henry) (1734–1785), American member of Colonial Virginia House of Burgesses
William Henry (congressman) (1788–1861), American legislator from Vermont
William Alexander Henry (1816–1888), Canadian Supreme Court justice
William Wirt Henry (1831–1900), American lawyer, politician and historian in Virginia
William H. Henry, Socialist Party of America Executive Secretary during late 1920s
William Thomas Henry (1872–1952), Canadian politician; Legislative Assembly of Alberta member
William Henry, Libertarian nominee for Lieutenant Governor of Indiana in the 2020 Indiana gubernatorial election

Royalty
William Henry, Prince of Orange (1650–1702), future King William III of England
William Henry, Prince of Nassau-Usingen (1684–1718), member of German royalty
William Henry, Prince of Nassau-Saarbrücken (1718–1768), member of German royalty
Prince William Henry, Duke of Gloucester and Edinburgh (1743–1805), younger brother of King George III of the United Kingdom
William Henry, Duke of Clarence (1765–1837), future King William IV of the United Kingdom

Sportspeople
William Henry (swimmer) (1859–1928), English Olympic competitor
Billy Henry (1884–after 1960), Scottish footballer
Bill Henry (footballer) (1904–1974), Australian rules forward
Bill Henry (basketball) (1924–1985), American center
Bill Henry (baseball, born 1927) (1927–2014), American pitcher for six MLB teams
Bill Henry (baseball, born 1942), American pitcher for New York Yankees
Willie Henry (born 1994), American football defensive tackle
Will Henry (footballer) (born 1998), English goalkeeper

Writers
William Henry (priest) (before 1728–1768), Anglo-Irish Dean of Killaloe
William Arnon Henry (1850–1932), American academic and agriculturist from Ohio
William J. Henry (1867–1955), American hymn writer
Bill Henry (Los Angeles Times) (1890–1970), American newspaper reporter
Bill Fitz Henry (1903–1957), Australian journalist with The Bulletin
Will Henry (novelist) (1912–1991), pen name of American screenwriter Henry Wilson Allen 
William E. Henry (1918–1994), American psychologist
William A. Henry III (1950–1994), American author and cultural critic
"Will Henry", pen name of William Henry Wilson, cartoonist and writer of Wallace the Brave

Others
William Henry (missionary) (1770-1859), Irish missionary, active in Tahiti and New South Wales, Australia
William Henry (chemist) (1774–1836), English chemist who formulated Henry’s law
William Henry (pastor) (1783-1839), Scottish Congregationalist pastor 
William "Jerry" Henry (1811–after 1851), American fugitive slave who was freed in New York event known as Jerry Rescue
William W. Henry (1831–1915), American Civil War Medal of Honor recipient
William Henry (actor) (1914–1982), American performer; also billed as Bill Henry 
E. William Henry (born 1929), American public official; chairman of FCC

See also
Fort William Henry, British fort built in upper New York during 1754–63 French and Indian War; referenced in Last of the Mohicans
William-Henry, name of Canadian city Sorel-Tracy from 1787 to 1845
Bill Henry (film), 1919 American comedy directed by Jerome Storm

Henry, William